Lesbian, gay, bisexual, and transgender (LGBT) people generally have limited or highly restrictive rights in most parts of the Middle East, and are open to hostility in others. Sex between men is illegal in 9 of the 18 countries that make up the region. It is punishable by death in five of these 18 countries. The rights and freedoms of LGBT citizens are strongly influenced by the prevailing cultural traditions and religious mores of people living in the region – particularly Islam.

All same-sex activity is legal in Bahrain, Cyprus, Northern Cyprus, Israel, Jordan, Lebanon and Turkey.

Male same-sex activity is illegal and punishable by imprisonment in Kuwait, Egypt, Oman and Syria. It is also punishable by death in Iran, Saudi Arabia, Qatar and the United Arab Emirates. In Yemen and the Gaza Strip, the punishment might differ between death and imprisonment depending on the act committed.

History

Evidence of homosexuality in the Middle East can be traced back at least until the time of Ancient Egypt and Mesopotamia. In ancient Assyria, sex crimes were punished identically whether they were homosexual or heterosexual. An individual faced no punishment for penetrating someone of equal social class, a cult prostitute, or with someone whose gender roles were not considered solidly masculine. In an Akkadian tablet, the Šumma ālu, it states, "If a man copulates with his equal from the rear, he becomes the leader among his peers and brothers". However, homosexual relationships with fellow soldiers, slaves, royal attendants, or those where a social better was submissive or penetrated, were treated as bad omens. A Middle Assyrian Law Codes dating from 1075 BC has a rather harsh law for homosexuality in the military, which reads: "If a man have intercourse with his brother-in-arms, they shall turn him into a eunuch."

Around 250 BC, during the Parthian Empire, the Zoroastrian text Vendidad was written. It contains provisions that are part of sexual code promoting procreative sexuality that is interpreted to prohibit same-sex intercourse as sinful. Ancient commentary on this passage suggests that those engaging in sodomy could be killed without permission from a high priest. However, a strong homosexual tradition in Iran is attested to by Greek historians from the 5th century onward, and so the prohibition apparently had little effect on Iranian attitudes or sexual behavior outside the ranks of devout Zoroastrians in rural eastern Iran.

Attitudes toward lesbian, gay, bisexual, and transgender (LGBT) people and their experiences in the Muslim world have been influenced by its religious, legal, social, political, and cultural history.

The Quran narrates the story of the "people of Lot" destroyed by the wrath of Islamic God because the men engaged in lustful carnal acts between themselves. Within the Quran, it never states that homosexuality is punishable by death, and modern historians conclude that the Islamic prophet Muhammad never forbade homosexual relationships, although he shared contempt towards them alongside his contemporaries. However, some hadith collections condemn homosexual and transgender acts, prescribing death penalty for both the active and receptive partners who have engaged in male homosexual intercourse.

There is little evidence of homosexual practice in Islamic societies for the first century and a half of the early history of Islam, although male homosexual relationships were known and ridiculed, but not sanctioned, in Arabia.

During the medieval period and the early modern age, Middle Eastern societies saw a flourishing of homo-erotic literature. Shusha Guppy of the Times Higher Education Supplement argued that although it "has long been assumed that the Arab-Islamic societies have always been less tolerant of homosexuality than the West", in "the pre-modern era, Western travelers were amazed to find Islam 'a sex-positive religion' and men openly expressing their love for young boys in words and gestures."

During the Islamic Golden Age, the Abbasid dynasty is known for being relatively liberal regarding homosexuality. This is due to a variety of factors, notably the move towards a more bureaucratic Islamic rule and away from literalist adherence to the scripture.

Many Islamic rulers were known to engage in, or at least tolerate, homosexual activity. For instance, Umayyad Caliph Al-Walid II was said to enjoy "al-talawut", an Arabic word for sex with other men. Abu Nuwas, one of the most prominent Arab poets to extensively produce homoerotic works, did so under the tutelage and protection of Harun al-Rashid. Harun al-Rashid's successor, Al-Amin, rejected women and concubines, preferring eunuchs instead.

Homosexual acts are forbidden in traditional Islamic jurisprudence and are liable to different punishments, including the death penalty, depending on the situation and legal school. However, homosexual relationships were generally tolerated in pre-modern Islamic societies, and historical records suggest that these laws were invoked infrequently, mainly in cases of rape or other "exceptionally blatant infringement on public morals". Public attitudes toward homosexuality in the Muslim world underwent a marked negative change starting from the 19th century through the gradual spread of Islamic fundamentalist movements such as Salafism and Wahhabism, and the influence of the sexual notions and restrictive norms prevalent in Europe at the time: a number of Muslim-majority countries have retained criminal penalties for homosexual acts enacted under European colonial rule.

In the 19th and early 20th century, homosexual activity was relatively common in the Middle East, owing in part to widespread sex segregation, which made heterosexual encounters outside marriage more difficult. Georg Klauda writes that "Countless writers and artists such as André Gide, Oscar Wilde, Edward M. Forster, and Jean Genet made pilgrimages in the 19th and 20th centuries from homophobic Europe to Algeria, Morocco, Egypt, and various other Arab countries, where homosexual sex was not only met without any discrimination or subcultural ghettoization whatsoever, but rather, additionally as a result of rigid segregation of the sexes, seemed to be available on every corner." Homosexuality was outlawed in 1943 in Lebanon, to conform to the rule of the Vichy regime of France. The law is known as article 543 in the country's Penal Code. In Iran, men could be intimate with other men without being in a formal relationship. Young men without facial hair were considered beautiful and older men would pursue them. It was not until the nineteenth century, when Europeans began to visit Iran, that the view of homosexual male relationships became negative. European men claimed the relations between Iranian men were immoral. This European perspective was widely adopted by Iranian society. This outlook on queerness within the Middle East has worsened as totalitarian governments, beginning in the 1970s, came to power and justified their values on Islamic fundamentalism.

Transgender people have also faced backlash in the Middle East in the late 1900s. There was fear that because one could not differentiate men and women based on their outer appearance, it would cause instability within society. Gender reaffirming surgeries were introduced and became accessible and prevalent among transgender women in Iran. In 1976, the Medical Council of Iran outlawed gender reassignment surgery after seeing the increase of procedures among transgender women. They have changed this ruling since then.

Before globalization, Middle Eastern men and women who had homosexual relations did not consider themselves to be 'homosexual'. Due to the exchanges between the West and Middle East, the idea of "homosexuality" was introduced to Middle Eastern regions and these people were then encouraged to associate themselves with new labels, such as "gay", "lesbian", "straight", and more. Before the use of these labels, people did not categorize their sexuality in that way.

The Middle East today 
In Iran, Saudi Arabia, Qatar, the United Arab Emirates, and Yemen, the laws state that if a person is found guilty of engaging in same-sex sexual behavior, the death penalty would be applied. According to Country Reports of the US Department of State, in Saudi Arabia there are no established LGBT organizations. Furthermore, reports of official and social discrimination on the grounds of sexual orientation remains unclear because of strong social pressure of not to discuss LGBT matters. In Iraq, homosexuality is not  de jure punishable by law but LGBT people can be charged under public indecency law 401. Which penalizes anything deemed contrary to public decency or morality with up to 6 months imprisonment and fines. People also face vigilante execution, beatings, torture, and attacks by vigilantes and Sharia courts.

Jordan and Bahrain are the only Arab countries where homosexuality is legal; Some Middle Eastern nations have some tolerance and legal protections for transsexual and transgender people. For example, the Iranian government has approved sex change operations under medical approval. The Syrian government has approved similar operations back in 2011. LGBT rights movements have existed in other Middle Eastern nations, including Turkey and Lebanon. However, in both Turkey and Lebanon, changes have been slow and recent crackdown on LGBT oriented events have raised concerns about the freedom of association and expression of LGBT people and organizations.

Israel is a notable exception, being the most supportive towards LGBT rights and recognizing unregistered cohabitation. Popular support for LGBT rights  and the disparity between the liberal LGBT rights in Israel and Palestine  render the motivation of these assertions dubitable, especially because of the very low popular support for LGBT rights in Palestine. Same-sex marriage is not legal in the country but there is public support for recognizing and registering same-sex marriages performed in other countries. Israel also allows transgender individuals to legally change their gender without surgery. Transgender individuals can serve openly in the Israel Defense Forces.

There are different legal systems in Palestine. A report of Human Rights Watch in relation to sexual orientation and gender identity in the Middle East notes:
The British Mandate Criminal Code Ordinance, No. 74 of 1936 is in force in Gaza. In the West Bank, including East Jerusalem, the Jordanian Penal Code of 1960 applies, and does not contain provisions prohibiting adult consensual same-sex conduct. In Gaza, having "unnatural intercourse" of a sexual nature, understood to include same-sex relationships, is a crime punishable by up to 10 years in prison. In February 2016, Hamas's armed wing executed one of its fighters ostensibly for "behavioral and moral violations," which Hamas officials acknowledged meant same-sex relations.

Meanwhile, popular support for LGBT-rights in Palestine is practically non-existent and LGBT persons are regularly endangered by mob violence.

Arab and Muslim views of homosexuality as a purely "Western" creation have been explored in the film Dangerous Living: Coming Out in the Developing World. The starting line of the dialogue spoken by an as yet unseen gay Egyptian man stating "I was accused of being Westernized."

A report of Human Rights Watch in relation to LGBT rights in the Middle East notes:
In a few places, like Egypt and Morocco, sexual orientation and gender identity issues have begun to enter the agendas of some mainstream human rights movements. Now, unlike in earlier years, there are lawyers to defend people when they are arrested, and voices to speak up in the press. These vital developments were not won through identity politics. Those have misfired disastrously as a way of claiming rights in much of the Middle East; the urge of some western LGBT activists to unearth and foster ‘gay’ politics in the region is potentially deeply counterproductive. Rather, the mainstreaming was won largely by framing the situations of LGBT (or otherwise-identified) people in terms of the rights violations, and protections, that existing human rights movements understand. (Human Rights Watch 2009, p. 18)

Although many Middle Eastern countries have penal codes against homosexual acts, these are seldom enforced due to the difficulty to prove unless caught in the act. In the Middle East today many countries still do not have codification of homosexuality or queerness as an identification of sexual orientation. In Saudi Arabia, gender segregation is practiced to uphold the purity of women, because this separation exists some women and men will openly seek homosexual companionship in open spaces like coffee shops, public bathrooms, their cars, and their households. To navigate their own sexuality many men who engage in homosexual acts in Saudi Arabia do not deem the acts to be homosexual unless they are a bottom, which is a sexual position deemed to be more feminine while a top is deemed to be masculine.

In Iran there is a strict gender binary. The government enforces the gender binary by suppressing information about homosexuality and encouraging people questioning their sexuality to undergo sex reassignment surgery. Since the sex reassignment surgery is accepted by the government and religious institutions along with obtaining funding from the government for the surgery many Iranians who are attracted to the same sex see this as a way to be public about their sexual orientation without being persecuted by the government. Since being homosexual is not an option presented to Iranians, there has been a surge in the amount of Iranians who undergo gender reassignment surgery when their sexual orientation is towards the same sex. Sex reassignment surgery is encouraged by clerics, psychologists, and the government as homosexuality is illegal and punishable by imprisonment, lashing or execution. This has led to a bolstering transgender community in Iran as homosexuality has been removed from society as an identity leading homosexuals and transsexuals to all seek gender reassignment surgery. The people who undergo these surgeries are fully accepted by the government but families still often reject family members who undergo sex reassignment surgery. Family members are a primary resource for job acquisition in Iran. Without a social network to call on for job leads it is increasingly difficult to find work, and transsexuals are discriminated against in the job market forcing them into sex work.

Qatar, however, has modified the LGBT laws in the wake of 2022 FIFA World Cup tournament. Homosexuality is a criminal offence in Qatar, yet the Arab nation stated that LGBT fans would be welcome to the biggest sports event. In May 2022, the Emir of Qatar Sheikh Tamim bin Hamad al-Thani stated “everyone is welcome” to attend the FIFA World Cup 2022 event in Qatar, including the LGBTQ fans.

“We will not stop anybody from coming and enjoying the football. But I also want everybody to come and understand and enjoy our culture. We welcome everybody, but also we expect and we want people to respect our culture,” he said.

Qatar aimed to host the FIFA World Cup tournament in a welcoming and safe manner with the football fans and LGBTQ+ fans. According to Numbeo Crime Index by Country 2022, out of 142 surveyed nations, Qatar has maintained its position as the 'Safest Country' in the world. Although the European teams competing at the 2022 Qatar World Cup walked back their plans to wear “OneLove” armbands in support of LGBTQ rights during the tournament, following warnings from international soccer governing body FIFA that they would be penalized for doing so.

The Ministry of Education in UAE approved a code of conduct that prohibits education professionals from discussing “gender identity, homosexuality or any other behavior deemed unacceptable to the UAE's society” in their respective classes. A majority of education professionals working at the Emirati institutions are foreign nationals employed as English language teacher. The ruling could affect a majority of its recipients in the Gulf state. As far as homosexuals maintain a low profile in the UAE, they have remained safe from legal scrutiny.

Regional LGBTQ NGOs and Solidarity Groups 
Listed below are a few ally organizations that aim to help and support LGBT people in the Middle East. Other organizations with the same goal exist as well; however, these are the organizations that have made the most impact in the regions thus far.

Rainbow Street

Rainbow Street is a non-governmental organization (NGO) that is determined to help LGBT people in the Middle East and North Africa (MENA) region by providing support to those who experience systemic oppression and persecution due to their gender identity and/or sexual orientation. The organization aims to provide queer and trans people with the necessary resources needed to ensure they have access to safe, discrete and capable providers.

OutRight Action International

OutRight is a NGO that promotes human rights of LGBT people around the world, including in the Middle East. The organization focuses more on Iraq, Iran, and Turkey, but also partners with other groups in the region in order to listen to local LGBT activists, and advocate on their behalf at the United Nations. The partnerships include organizations in Algeria, Egypt, Jordan, Libya, Morocco, Kuwait, Oman and Lebanon. The organization works with these groups on "different topics through capacity building, advocacy, research and holistic security." The largest project that they have is in Iran which is focused on assistance to the LGBT community in Iran. In order to counter prejudiced views in the media, provide necessary legal and religious frameworks that promote tolerance and in an effort to make their research accessible OutRight Action International created a wide range of resources in Persian.

OutRight has a significant program in the organization called LBQ Connect which aims provide for support for "lesbian, bisexual and queer activism around the world." Due to the marginalization of women who identify as queer, bisexual or lesbian as well as trans and nonbinary people, the organization centers these people in their framework in effort to provide support and resources. OutRight seeks to challenge prejudice, violence and discrimination experienced by those who identify as LGBT throughout the world and providing these individuals with training and monetary resources to strengthen their skills and improve research. The research conducted influences changes in the LBQ program and overall advocacy agenda of the organization.

Helem

Helem (Arabic: حلم) is a NGO based in Lebanon, established in the 2000s, that has the main goal of annulling article 534 in Lebanon's Penal Code which punishes "unnatural sexual intercourse", particularly sexual relations involve anal sex. The organization was the first of its kind within the Arab World. Helem is an acronym for Himaya Lubnaniya lil Mithliyeen wal Mithliyat, which translates to "Lebanese protection for gays and lesbians." The acronym itself means "dream". The Penal Code is most commonly used to target people that do not conform to society's gender binary system. Individuals who express gender non-conformity are punished not only through the Penal Code but also in the interest of maintaining public morality. Helem's other goals include making Lebanese society more aware about the AIDS epidemic and other sexually transmitted diseases in the country, and advocating for the rights of Lebanese LGBT individuals. Helem also allows allies to access membership to the organization. Although Helem was started to address the rights of the LGBT Community it has incorporated social work into the organization's mission. The organization advocates for marginalized communities throughout Lebanon and the Arab World. Helem seeks to "work not only on issues related to identity and civil/political rights, but also prioritize social and economic rights by leveraging law, development, and community mobilization as tools for equality and liberation.

The focus on marginalized communities sparked outrage throughout Lebanon when Helem invited people who weren't of Lebanese nationality into the organization during the Cedar Revolution. Helem supports and advocates for domestic workers and refugees including those who have left their home countries in fear of discrimination due to their sexual orientation. In 2006, Helem joined Samidoun, to continue their work of advocating for refugees and those affected by war. Helem created an annual event called "international day against homophobia (IDAHO)" and the first event took place in May 2005. The organization has faced scrutiny and obstacles from the government and members of the community whilst trying to carry out their mission. A longstanding belief throughout the community is that HELEM is trying to impose Western imperialism and ideals in Lebanon and throughout the Arab World.

Majal

Majal is a NGO in the Middle East and North Africa (MENA) that was established in Bahrain in 2016 and it focuses on "amplifying underrepresented voices." Majal "translates to opportunity or to give away" in Arabic. The organization centers the rights of different marginalized groups throughout MENA including the LGBT community. Majal provides various platforms that focus on distributing information, resources and having community led discussion to highlight the experiences of marginalized groups. Ahwaa is a platform on Majal that provides LGBT people in MENA a digital space to have discussions through game mechanics. The space uses avatars that protects users from disclosing their identities in an effort to reduce discrimination and persecution and to promote conversations regarding gender identity and sexual orientation. When users exhibit positive contributions and are supported by their peers, they gain more access to the platform. This system protects users from individuals that are using the platform to cause harm to others.

Laws 
This section is by no means exhaustive, and does not cover every particular law pertaining to LGBT rights. This is partly due to the non-existence of these laws in some Middle Eastern States, and also due to the laws being available in Arabic.

Social context and extrajudicial violence 
Beyond the sphere of legislative politics, individuals who practice behaviors that can be considered LGBTQ and/or people who directly identify as lesbian, gay, bisexual, trans, or queer often face profound social consequences due to this designation falling outside of the cultural "normal". These consequences can include negative repercussions in one's family life and social marginalization, as well as direct violence and even honor killings. Discrimination towards LGBTQ people is therefore not only a legal matter but a social and cultural phenomenon that must be understood beyond just the letter of the law as it is codified. Due to the power dynamics specific to societies in the Middle East today, one must therefore look not only to law but also to social norms and cultural practices in order to understand the state of LGBTQ rights in the region. As put by Sabiha Allouche, Senior Teaching Fellow at the University of London SOAS, the traditional "formulation of the legal sphere" throughout the history of queer advocacy in the West is "not necessarily applicable to contexts where penal codes often intertwine with further regulatory systems, including religion, customs, traditions, and kin-based patterns of governance." The elitism and jargon endemic to the NGO-ization of human rights advocacy in the region can actually impede the endeavors of these organization, in that NGO-ization causes the work of local activists to be perceived as systematic colonial intervention from the west.

As happens in European and North American nations, interpretations of religious doctrine are commonly used as justifications for violence and exclusion of gay people from society. Christian populations in the Middle East persecute gay people as well, demonstrating that cultural customs may play a role as much as religion. The centrality of heterosexual family structures to social and religious rituals can also lead to heightened scrutiny from people in one's own family.

Due to the illegality and stigma around people who identify as LGBT, there is a dearth in the quantity of credible data collected regarding violence and discrimination that LGBT individuals face on a daily basis. However, a report written by Outright International submitted to UNHRC regarding violence and discrimination based on sexual orientation and gender identity in Iraq has found that despite LGBT rights being protected by the law, there exists no feasible legal recourse for victims of such hate crimes.

Censorship

Films 
Due to homosexuality laws, many films with LGBT characters or themes have been banned in many Middle Eastern countries, especially in the Gulf states. Below are some notable examples.

Public opinion 
A Pew Research Center survey conducted in found that over 80% of people polled rejected homosexuality as "morally unacceptable". Those who do identify with the LGBTQ community live in hiding due to the fear of backlash and punishment. While some are comfortable to attend LGBTQ themed events, many will wear masks to cover their identities.

On 22 February 2022, Ubisoft announced to withdraw the Six Invitational 2022 tournament from being held in the UAE, days after its LGBTQ+ personnel, players and fan base protested against the selection of the country for the event. The event was officially moved from the UAE due to the acute criticism of its treatment of lesbian, gay, bisexual and transgender people. The Rainbow Six Siege tournament is held thrice every year; a game that features LGBTQ+ characters.

Acceptance of homosexuality as a practice

Acceptance of homosexuality by society

Acceptance of homosexuals as neighbours 
Below is a table of attitudes towards homosexuals as neighbours in the Middle East, according to a World Values Survey from 2017 to 2020.

Justifiability of homosexuality

Perceived acceptance of homosexuals

See also

 Sexual taboo in the Middle East
 GCC homosexuality test
 LGBT in Islam
 Homosexuality and Judaism
 Transgender rights in Iran
 Islam and modernity
 Middle East and globalization
LGBT rights by country
 LGBT rights in Bahrain
 LGBT rights in Cyprus
 LGBT rights in Egypt
 LGBT rights in Iran
 LGBT rights in Iraq
 LGBT rights in Israel
 LGBT rights in Jordan
 LGBT rights in Kuwait
 LGBT rights in Lebanon
 LGBT rights in Northern Cyprus
 LGBT rights in Oman
 LGBT rights in the State of Palestine
 LGBT rights in Qatar
 LGBT rights in Saudi Arabia
 LGBT rights in Syria
 LGBT rights in Turkey
 LGBT rights in the United Arab Emirates
 LGBT rights in Yemen

References

Bibliography

Further reading
 Beirne, Rebecca and Samar Habib. "Trauma and Triumph: Documenting Middle Eastern Gender and Sexual Minorities in Film and Television" (Chapter 2). In: Pullen, Christopher. LGBT Transnational Identity and the Media. Palgrave Macmillan. 29 February 2012. , 9780230353510.
 El-Rouayheb, Khaled. Before Homosexuality in the Arab-Islamic World, 1500-1800, Chicago: University of Chicago Press, 2005. See profile page
 Habib, Samar. Female Homosexuality in the Middle East: Histories and Representations. Routledge, July 18, 2007. , 9780415956734. View pages at Google Books. 
Patanè, Vincenzo. "Homosexuality in the Middle East and North Africa" in: Aldrich, Robert (ed.) Gay Life and Culture: A World History, Thames & Hudson, London, 2006
Whitaker, Brian. Unspeakable Love: Gay and Lesbian Life in the Middle East. University of California Press, 2006. , 9780520250178.  See pages at Google Books.
Wright, J. W., Jr. and Everett K. Rowson (editors). Homoeroticism in Classical Arabic Literature. Columbia University Press, 1997.

External links
 Rainbow Street, LGBT human rights organization.

 
LGBT rights by region